"Painted in Blood" is the third episode of the sixth season of British television show Midsomer Murders and the twenty-sixth episode overall. It stars John Nettles as Detective Chief Inspector Tom Barnaby and Daniel Casey as Detective Sergeant Gavin Troy.

Plot
Joyce Barnaby joins a painting society, and finds the body of Ruth Fairfax, an elderly lady who is part of her art class. Almost as soon as she is identified, her husband, DCI Barnaby is quickly replaced by members of the National Intelligence Squad (NIS) and finds himself relegated to Operation Pondlife, a local initiative designed to clamp down on bag snatching. DS Troy continues on the murder case, and at first is dazzled by the visiting detectives who take him under their wing.

Investigating unofficially after he has been taken off the case, Barnaby discovers that the murdered painter was in fact a member of the NIS disguised as an old woman. He feeds evidence to Troy, who gradually becomes disillusioned with the way the NIS conduct their inquiries - for instance in their attempt to frame a local house painter, they exclude him from the interrogation when he suggests inquiries that might exonerate the suspect.

Barnaby deduces that 'Ruth Fairfax' was murdered by the NIS investigating officer, who was disguised as one of the watercolourists. This was because she was honest, whereas the other NIS officers are crooked. One of the members of a gang which pulled off a big robbery at Heathrow had given evidence against his colleagues and in return been given a new identity under the witness protection programme. He had hidden £5 million inside an old linen press in the security vault of the local branch of Shires Bank. The crooked NIS officers try to steal the money, but Barnaby and Troy foil them. The two junior NIS officers turn on their boss because he has murdered their female colleague despite having promised them there would be no violence. The 3 NIS officers are arrested.

There are several amusing subplots:
 The local woman who looks drives Joyce home after she discovers the corpse is dismissive of older men who turn to drink; when Barnaby comes home, he immediately pours himself a glass of wine;
 The NIS officers, who ape the FBI by wearing sharp suits and sunglasses, are derisive of the skills of their rural colleagues, yet Barnaby and Troy out-detect them;
 The bank branch is to be closed, and the bank manager decides to steal some of the hidden money, but repents when Barnaby arrives. However he is consoled when the art teacher tells him the antique linen press is worth a lot of money.

The episode features performances from John Sessions as the art teacher and Leslie Phillips as a retired major.

Murders

There is only one murder committed in this episode. However, throughout the episode, there are various crimes committed including 2 attempted bank robberies in the episode's conclusion, taking place within minutes of each other.

Ruth Fairfax (also known as Angela Browning): Stabbed in the back on the village green with a chisel whilst painting.

References

Midsomer Murders episodes
2002 British television episodes